This is a list of members of both houses of the Federal Assembly from the Canton of Basel-Landschaft. As one of the cantons defined until 1999 as "half-cantons", Basel-Landschaft elects only one member to the Council of States

Members of the Council of States

Members of the National Council

Notes

References

Lists of Members of the Swiss Federal Assembly by canton